.paris is a top-level domain for the city of Paris, France. It was introduced in June 2008 by ICANN, and the first 100 ".paris" web addresses were assigned in mid-2014. 

At the time of launch, domain names corresponding to Parisian places (streets, squares, etc.) were reserved for the authorities concerned. Others, very generic, were blocked without the registry having yet made a decision on the allocation method.

From September to November 2014, the rightful owners of trademarks (protected, company names, names of French municipalities...) were given priority in registering .paris domain names. It was also possible to register, without having any particular rights, domain names before the general public opening at a higher rate, or even at auction if several candidates coveted the same domain name.

Since December 2, 2014, .paris is open to the general public. The available domain names are allocated on a first-come, first-served basis.

References

See also

 Internet in France
 .fr –CC TLD for the Republic of France
 .eu –CC TLD for the European Union

Generic top-level domains
Culture of Paris
Internet in France